Balogun may refer to:

Balogun (name)
Balogun Market in Lagos, Nigeria
Teslim Balogun Stadium in Lagos, Nigeria
Folarin Balogun, footballer who plays for Arsenal